Atang may refer to:
Atang (food offering), Philippines
Atang, a village in Burma
Atang de la Rama (1902–1991), a singer and bodabil performer who became the first Filipina film actress
Tropical Storm Atang (disambiguation)